Coventry United Football Club is an English association football club based in Coventry in the West Midlands.

The club was founded in 2013 by chairman Jason Kay along with three co-chairmen Jason Timms, Marcus Green and Pete Schofield and Club secretary Graham Wood following a takeover of Coventry Spartans in reaction to Coventry City moving from the Ricoh Arena to Northampton to play at Sixfields Stadium. Edwin Greaves had been in charge at the club since its formation until Spring 2016, when he was replaced by current manager Terry Anderson.

On 4 July 2015, the club announced the takeover of Coventry City Ladies F.C, re-branding the ladies side Coventry United Ladies F.C.

History

2013 
Following the takeover of Coventry Spartans, Coventry United Football Club was born. 4 Local businessmen had a dream. To play football without politics and live for the enjoyment of the game. Spartan's manager, Edwin Greaves stayed on as Coventry United's first manager, along with club secretary, Graham Wood. The Red and Green story began. Our debut league match took place at Kenilworth Town in the Midland Football League Division 3 on Saturday 13 August 2013 with a 2–1 victory. Kenroy Dennisur and Brian Ndlovu scoring the goals that day. The desire for success was evident from the very first whistle, and success was not far away. United finished runners-up to Kenilworth, securing promotion at the very first attempt. Our first league title followed the next season. United dominated MFL Division 2, finishing a mammoth 15 points ahead of our closest rivals. Progression to Step 6 of the Non-League Pyramid followed. Season 3 would bring a fierce battle for the Division 1 title with the likes of Bromsgrove Sporting, Lichfield, and Nuneaton Griff.

2016 
In March 2016, Edwin Greaves left the club and was replaced on an interim basis by Terry Anderson, along with his assistant, Luke Morton. Under Terry's stewardship United began a sensational run to win their final 11 matches, conceding just 3 goals along the way. Consequently, they beat their impressive competition to the title. Needless to say, Terry and Luke's roles were secured on a permanent basis. Following a flurry of promotions, Coventry settled into the MFL Premier Division, continuing to grow on and off the pitch.

2017 
Following stints at The Cage (Alan Higgs Centre) and Sphinx Drive, the summer of 2017 saw United move into their new home, the Butts Park Arena.

2020 
The club was bought from the original owners by Coventry-based businessman Joe Haggarty. After 5 seasons in the MFL Premier Division and finishing as Coventry's highest ranked non-league club for 5 years in a row, the restructuring of the non-league pyramid saw Coventry United placed in the United Counties League Premier Division South. Following the departure of Terry Anderson in November 2021, the Red and Greens hired manager, Russell Dodds, and assistant manager, Darren Acton. They unfortunately resigned from their roles due to personal reasons several weeks later.

2022 
February 2022, Joe Haggarty resigned as chairman and manager of Coventry United Football Club, with Ivor Lawton taking charge of first team responsibilities. Long term club supporter Nigel Ward took over the club in March 2022. Nigel's tireless efforts to make up for lost time and money over the summer, along with the hard-working officials and volunteers, put the club in a much stronger position, both on and off the field, than during the closing months of the 2021/22 campaign. With his job to stabilize the club completed, Nigel stepped aside and was replaced as chairman by local businessman, Michael Kavanagh, with John Goodman appointed as Vice Chairman. In the summer of 2022 Carl Nolan took over as Team Manager.

Stadium 

Coventry United currently play their home games at The Butts Park Arena in Coventry.

Butts Park Arena is a multi-use sports stadium in Spon End, Coventry, England. Its main use is as a rugby stadium. It is the home ground for Coventry R.F.C.

It was also formerly the home ground of the Coventry Jets, an American football team. From the 2017–18 season, the stadium is also the home of Coventry United, a non-league football club.

The stadium was built in 2004 and currently has one stand, known for sponsorship reasons as the XL Motors stand, which has a capacity of 3,000 and includes a number of conference and banqueting facilities. The West Stand which was a temporary structure holding 1,000 was removed at the end of the 2005–06 season on grounds of health and safety. There is also standing space for up to 1,000 supporters around the pitch.

In June 2019 the pitch was replaced with an artificial playing surface.

Colours

Coventry United's home kit is made up of the city's civic colours, red and green.

The shirt is red are the shorts and socks are the same shade of dark green.

The club's away strip is a full dark green strip.

Ladies
On 4 July 2015, Coventry City Ladies F.C. announced that they will merge with Coventry United and be rebranded as Coventry United Ladies F.C. from the beginning of the 2015–16 Women's Premier League season.

The move means that the team will play in Coventry United Men's team colours, also the cities civic colours, red and green rather than Coventry City's sky blue. They will also continue playing home games at The Bedworth Oval. The clubs were keen to point out that the ladies team will still be independently run, with its own board of directors.

Backroom staff and club officials

Seasons

Records and honours

Club honours

Team records
Biggest league win: Coventry United 28–0 Polesworth (17 April 2014)
Biggest league loss: Quorn 7-1 Coventry United (16 April 2018)
Longest unbeaten run (all competitions): 25 matches (8 November 2014 – 4 May 2015)
Longest unbeaten run (league only): 21 matches (4 October 2014 – 4 May 2015)
Most clean sheets in a row (all competitions): 6 (19 April 2016 – 7 August 2016)
Most clean sheets in a row (league only) : 8 (19 April 2016 – 23 August 2016)

Player records
Most club appearances (all competitions): 179 (Chris Cox)
Most club appearances (league only): 146 (Chris Cox)
Top club goalscorer (all competitions): 60 (Joshua O'Grady)
Top club goalscorer (league only): 42 (Joshua O'Grady, Chris Cox, Daniel Stokes)
First competitive goal for the club: Stefan McGrath (10 October 2013)
Most goals scored in one game by a single player: 6 (Daniel Stokes (Coventry United 28–0 Polesworth; 17 April 2014))

References

External links
 Official Website

Football clubs in England
Sport in Coventry
Association football clubs established in 2013
2013 establishments in England
Southern Football League clubs
Football clubs in the West Midlands (county)
Midland Football League
United Counties League